The AACTA Award for Best Performance in a Television Comedy is an accolade given by the Australian Academy of Cinema and Television Arts (AACTA), a non-profit organisation whose aim is to "identify, award, promote and celebrate Australia's greatest achievements in film and television." The award is handed out at the annual AACTA Awards, which rewards achievements in Australian feature film, television, documentaries and short films. From 1986 to 2010, the category was presented by the Australian Film Institute (AFI), the Academy's parent organisation, at the annual Australian Film Institute Awards (known as the AFI Awards). When the AFI launched the Academy in 2011, it changed the annual ceremony to the AACTA Awards, with the current prize being a continuum of the AFI Award for Best Performance in a Television Comedy.

From 2003 to 2005, the award was given as a joint award with drama performances under the category Best Actor in a Leading Role in a Television Drama or Comedy. However, comedy performances was separated from the drama categories in 2006, when the award for Best Performance in a Television Comedy was created. Chris Lilley and Phil Lloyd have won the award the most times with two wins each.

Winners and nominees
In the following table, winners are listed first, in boldface and highlighted in gold; those listed below the winner that are not in boldface or highlighted are the nominees.

AFI Awards

AACTA Awards

See also
AACTA Award for Best Television Comedy Series
AACTA Awards

Notes

A: Comedy Inc: The Late Shift is a sketch comedy television series with various characters in each episode.
B: In Summer Heights High, Chris Lilley portrayed the three main characters: Ja'mie King, Mr G and Jonah Takalua.
C: Summer Heights High is a mockumentary, and therefore only one season was aired.
D: In Angry Boys, Chris Lilley portrayed the main characters: Daniel and Nathan Sims, S.mouse, Jen Okazaki, Gran and Blake Oakfield.
E: Angry Boys is a mockumentary, and therefore only one season was aired.
F: Lisa McCune was nominated for her performance in the first episode of It's a Date titled, "When Should You Abandon A Date?"

References

External links
The Australian Academy of Cinema and Television Arts Official website

Awards established in 2006
Comedy
Television awards for Best Actor
Television awards for Best Actress